The 1927–28 National Football League was the 2nd staging of the National Football League, a Gaelic football tournament for the Gaelic Athletic Association county teams of Ireland, held in 1927 and 1928.

The League was won by Kerry.

Format 
There were three divisions – Northern, Southern, and Western. Division winners played off for the NFL title.

The league was not decided by a one-match final. The three division winners played each other in a series of Inter-Divisional tests. As Kerry and Kildare both defeated Mayo, it meant that the Kerry v Kildare tie was a 'de facto' final.

Results

Northern Division

Table

Meath beat Down, but forfeited the points for being late on the field

Southern Division

Table

Laois were awarded the points in respect of their tie with Clare at Kilkee

Western Division
 won, finishing ahead of Sligo, Galway, Roscommon and Leitrim.

Inter-divisional tests

Table

References

National Football League
National Football League
National Football League (Ireland) seasons